Șasa may refer to several places in Romania:

 Șasa, a village in Lupșa Commune, Alba County
 Șasa, a village in Dănesti Commune, Gorj County
 Șasa, a village in Ileanda Commune, Sălaj County
 Șasa (river), a tributary of the Olteț in Vâlcea County